Many of the etymologies of Romanian counties are Romanian interpretations of Slavonic names (e.g.: Gorj and Dolj), as the administration documents in the Middle Ages Romanian Principalities (Wallachia and Moldavia) were written in this language.

Historical counties

Notes

References

See also 
 Counties of Romania

Romanian counties
Counties
Romania geography-related lists
Counties